Ashmith Kunder is an Indian film editor, Ad film director, film producer, and actor. He is the brother of filmmaker Shirish Kunder. He is best known for editing films like Dasavatharam (2008), Shor in the City (2010), Matrubhoomi: A Nation Without Women (2003). He got noticed as an actor with his debut in the extremely popular, multiple award winning, Amazon Prime original series, The Family Man, playing a very pivotal role, which became the source of numerous memes and kickstarted his career as a full-time actor. He became a producer with Babumoshai Bandookbaaz in the year 2017 starring Nawazuddin Siddiqui. 

His upcoming project is with the multiple national award winning Director Goutam Ghose's which is an Indo Italian feature film, Parikrama.

Personal life
Kunder was born in Mumbai, Maharashtra. He is an engineer by education (B.E. Instrumentation) from Mumbai University. Professionally, he is a film writer, director, editor, producer and actor. He is the brother of the well-known filmmaker Shirish Kunder and brother-in-law of choreographer Farah Khan.

Film career

Ashmith began his career in 2000 as an associate editor for the movie ‘Champion’. He then went on to be an editor for several movies like 88 Antop Hill (2003), Mumbai Xpress (2005), Ghatothkach  (2008), Lamhaa (2010), and Charlie Kay Chakkar Mein (2015). He was also a screenwriter and wrote the script for Tees Maar Khan which was directed by Farah Khan.

He was also involved in editing the Tamil film called Dasavatharam in 2008, in which Kamal Haasan plays 10 different roles. He also edited an animated Hindi film Ghatothkach in 2008 and worked as an additional writer. He is also an editor in Bollywood as well as Tollywood.

In 2017, Ashmith collaborated with Kushan Nandy and produced a movie called Babumoshai Bandookbaaz a film that showcases the life and times of a contract executioner, Babu, played by Nawazuddin Siddiqui.

He also worked on TVC's for two tea brands in Russia. He has also directed ad films for brands like Dove, McDonald's, Fisher Price, Barbie, Ponds, Piramal Healthcare, Nestlé, etc.

Ashmith Kunder did his debut role as the lead actor in the Hindi feature film Agam, where he plays the character of an Aghori Tantrik. The movie got selected for the 37th Cairo International Film Festival (CIFF) and other numerous film festivals.

Filmography
His upcoming projects as an Actor are, Director Raj DK's Guns & Gulaabs on Netflix and internationally acclaimed, multiple national award winning Director Goutam Ghose's Indo Italian feature film, Parikrama.

Television Series

References

External links
 Ashmith Kunder on IMDb

Indian film editors
Indian producers
People from Mumbai
Indian male actors
Year of birth missing (living people)
Living people
21st-century Indian actors